Remembering John is a 1991 album by McCoy Tyner released on the Enja label. It was recorded in February 1991 and features performances by Tyner with bassist Avery Sharpe and drummer Aaron Scott paying tribute to John Coltrane. The AllMusic review by Scott Yanow states that "McCoy Tyner still sounds enthusiastic and adventurous performing the timeless music".

Track listing
 "India" (Coltrane) - 6:57
 "Giant Steps" (Coltrane) - 2:26
 "In Walked Bud" (Monk) - 6:50
 "Like Someone in Love" (Burke, Van Heusen) - 7:40
 "One and Four" (Coltrane) - 5:11
 "Up 'Gainst the Wall" (Coltrane)  7:27
 "Good Morning Heartache" (Drake, Fisher, Higginbotham) - 5:46
 "Pursuance" (Coltrane) - 5:48
 "The Wise One" (Coltrane) - 9:36
Recorded at Clinton Recording Studios, New York City, New York, on February 27 & 28, 1991.

Personnel
McCoy Tyner - piano
Avery Sharpe - bass
Aaron Scott - drums

References

McCoy Tyner albums
1991 albums
Enja Records albums
John Coltrane tribute albums